Sankt Veit an der Glan is a town in the Austrian state of Carinthia, the administrative centre of the Sankt Veit an der Glan District. It was the historic Carinthian capital until 1518. The famous chef Wolfgang Puck was born there in 1949.

Geography

Location
The town is situated in the valley of the Glan River within the Gurktal Alps. Here the Glan reaches the Central Carinthian Zollfeld plain and flows southwards to Maria Saal and the state capital Klagenfurt.

Municipal arrangement
Sankt Veit consists of six Katastralgemeinden: Galling, Hörzendorf, Niederdorf, Projern, Sankt Donat and Tanzenberg. It is further divided into the following districts, with population figures at right:

History
Several archaeologic findings suggest a settlement in the area already in Carolingian times. According to legend, a 901 battle of Bavarian forces against invading Magyars instigated the founding of the town. As first mentioned in an 1131 deed, a Saint Vitus Church of the Roman Catholic Diocese of Gurk was located here within the Duchy of Carinthia. According to an 1137 agreement, it was "repurchased" by the Bishopric of Bamberg. 

However, already in 1149 it served as a residence of the Sponheim duke Heinrich V of Carinthia, where he received King Konrad III of Germany on his way back from the Second Crusade. He was succeeded by his brother Duke Hermann II of Carinthia, who became Vogt protector of the church in 1176 and subsequently the Sponheimer made the estates of Sankt Veit their permanent residence and capital of the Carinthian duchy, which it remained until 1518. Herman's son Bernhard von Spanheim (d. 1256) had the ducal castle and fortifications built, and granted Sankt Veit town privileges 1224. Here he held a glamorous court and received minnesingers like Walther von der Vogelweide, who stayed here in 1214, and Ulrich von Liechtenstein. Sankt Veit also may have been the domicile of Heinrich von dem Türlin where he wrote his Middle High German Diu Crône poem.

After the House of Sponheim had become extinct in 1269, the Carinthian duchy was acquired by King Otakar II of Bohemia, later it passed to the Meinhardiner Count Meinhard II of Tyrol. His granddaughter Countess Margaret in 1335 finally lost Carinthia to Duke Rudolf IV of Austria from the House of Habsburg, whereafter it was incorporated into the dynasty's Inner Austrian lands and ruled by stadtholders. In 1362 Rudolf granted the Sankt Veit citizens the permission to hold the annual Wiesenmarkt fair, which is arranged up to today as one of the oldest festivals in Central Europe. Its town hall dates from 1468 and the present-day ducal castle from the 15th to 16th century.

Demographics
At the 2001 census, it had a population of 12,045. Of that, 92.5% are Austrian, 2.3% are South Slavic, and 2.2% are Bosnian. 74.0% of the population profess themselves to be Roman Catholic, 8.6% are Lutherans/Protestants and 4.3% are Muslims, while 10.2% are without religious confession.

Politics

The town council is made up of 31 members. They are of the following parties:
21 SPÖ
5 ÖVP
4 FPÖ
1 Greens

The mayor is Gerhard Mock (SPÖ).

Industry

Literature
"Sankt Veit an der Glan: Eine Stadtgeographie", doctoral thesis, Graz, 1965, by H. Pressinger.

"Der Bezirk Sankt Veit an der Glan, seine Kunstwerke, historische Lebens -und Siedlungsformen" 1977, by S. Hartwagner.

Sports
Sankt Veit an der Glan is home to SC St. Veit, which currently plays in the 5th tier Unterliga Ost, they play their home matches at the Jacques Lemans Arena.

International relations

Entente Florale
Sankt Veit an der Glan has participated in the international horticultural competition Entente Florale, and won silver medal in 1999

Twin towns - Sister cities
Sankt Veit is twinned with:
 Haltern, Germany

References

External links

Encyclopædia Britannica
Sankt-Veit Encyclopedia Austria-Forum LINK

Cities and towns in Sankt Veit an der Glan District